The men's triple jump event  at the 1992 European Athletics Indoor Championships was held in Palasport di Genova on 1 March.

Results

References

Results

Triple jump at the European Athletics Indoor Championships
Triple